B'nai Jeshurun ( "Sons/Children of the Upright") may refer to the following Jewish synagogues:

B'nai Jeshurun (Manhattan, New York), the second synagogue founded in New York and the third-oldest Ashkenazi synagogue in the United States.
Congregation Bnai Yeshurun, a large Orthodox community in Teaneck, New Jersey
Congregation Emanu-El B'ne Jeshurun (River Hills, Wisconsin)
K. K. B'nai Yeshurun (Cincinnati, Ohio), commonly known as the Isaac M. Wise Temple
Temple B'nai Jeshurun (Demopolis, Alabama)
Temple of Congregation B'nai Jeshurun (Lincoln, Nebraska)
Temple Israel (Dayton, Ohio), known from the mid-nineteenth to the mid-twentieth centuries as "B'nai Jeshurun"

See also
 Jeshurun